ES Radès may refer to:
 ES Radès (basketball), basketball section of the multi-sports club
 ES Radès (football), football section of the multi-sports club